Paracles postflavida is a moth of the subfamily Arctiinae first described by Rothschild in 1922. It is found in Peru.

References

Moths described in 1922
Paracles